Soslan Tigiev (born October 12, 1983 in Vladikavkaz) is a Russian and Uzbekistani wrestler of Ossetian descent who competed in the freestyle 74 kg category. He was the 2006 Asian Games bronze medalist. Tigiev was initially awarded a silver medal at the 2008 Summer Olympics in Beijing and a bronze medal at the 2012 Summer Olympics in London. His 2012 Olympic medal was stripped on November 7, 2012 after he tested positive for the banned stimulant methylhexaneamine. He was stripped of his 2008 Olympic medal in 2016 after dehydrochlormethyltestosterone (turinabol) was found during retesting of his samples from Beijing.

References

1983 births
Living people
Sportspeople from Vladikavkaz
Uzbekistani people of Ossetian descent
Wrestlers at the 2008 Summer Olympics
Wrestlers at the 2012 Summer Olympics
Olympic wrestlers of Uzbekistan
Asian Games medalists in wrestling
Wrestlers at the 2006 Asian Games
Uzbekistani sportspeople in doping cases
Doping cases in wrestling
Competitors stripped of Summer Olympics medals
Uzbekistani male sport wrestlers
Asian Games bronze medalists for Uzbekistan
Medalists at the 2006 Asian Games